Central retinal artery occlusion (CRAO) is a disease of the eye where the flow of blood through the central retinal artery is blocked (occluded). There are several different causes of this occlusion; the most common is carotid artery atherosclerosis.

Signs and symptoms 

Central retinal artery occlusion is characterized by painless, acute vision loss in one eye. Upon fundoscopic exam, one would expect to find: cherry-red spot  (90%) (a morphologic description in which the normally red background of the choroid is sharply outlined by the swollen opaque retina in the central retina), retinal opacity in the posterior pole (58%), pallor (39%), retinal arterial attenuation (32%), and optic disk edema (22%). During later stages of onset, one may also find plaques, emboli, and optic atrophy.

Diagnosis 

One diagnostic method for the confirmation of CRAO is Fluorescein angiography, it is used to examine the retinal artery filling time after the fluorescein dye is injected into the peripheral venous system. In an eye with CRAO some branches of the retinal artery may not fill or the time it takes for the branches of the retinal artery to fill will be increased, which is visualized by the leading edge of the fluorescein moving slower than normal through the retinal artery branches to the edges of the retina. Fluorescein angiography can also be used to determine the extent of the occlusion as well as classify it into one of four types non-arteritic CRAO, non-arteritic CRAO with cilioretinal artery sparing, transient non-arteritic CRAO and arteritic CRAO. Optical coherence tomography (OCT) may also be used to confirm the diagnosis of CRAO.

Causes
CRAO can be classified based on it pathogenesis, as arteritic versus non-arteritic. Non-arteritic CRAO is most commonly caused by an embolus and occlusion at the narrowest part of the carotid retinal artery due to plaques in the carotid artery resulting in carotid retinal artery atherosclerosis. Further causes of non-arteritic CRAO may include vasculitis and chronic systemic autoimmune diseases. Arteritic CRAO is most commonly caused by giant cell arteritis. Other causes can include dissecting aneurysms and arterial spasms, and as a complication of patient positioning causing external compression of the eye compressing flow to the central retinal artery (e.g. in spine surgeries in the prone position).

Mechanism 
The ophthalmic artery branches off into the central retinal artery which travels with the optic nerve until it enters the eye. This central retinal artery provides nutrients to the retina of the eye, more specifically the inner retina and the surface of the optic nerve. Variations, such as branch retinal artery occlusion, can also occur. Central retinal artery occlusion is most often due to emboli blocking the artery and therefore prevents the artery from delivering nutrients to most of the retina. These emboli originate from the carotid arteries most of the time but in 25% of cases, this is due to plaque build-up in the ophthalmic artery. The most frequent site of blockage is at the most narrow part of the artery which is where the artery pierces the dura covering the optic nerve. Some people have cilioretinal arterial branches, which may or may not be included in the blocked portion.

Treatment 
While no treatment has been clearly demonstrated to be benefit for CRAO in large systematic reviews of randomized clinical trials, many of the following are frequently used:
 Lowering intraocular pressure;
 Dilating the CRA;
 Increasing oxygenation;
 Isovolemic hemodilution;
 Anticoagulation;
 Dislodging or fragmenting thrombus or embolus;
 Thrombolysis; and
 Hyperbaric oxygen.

To achieve the best outcome for a person with CRAO, it is important to identify the condition in a timely manner and to refer to the appropriate specialist.

Prognosis 
The artery can re-canalize over time and the edema can clear. However, optic atrophy leads to permanent loss of vision. Irreversible damage to neural tissue can occur after approximately 15 minutes of complete blockage to the central retinal artery, but this time may vary between people. Two thirds of people experience 20/400 vision while only one in six will experience 20/40 vision or better.

Epidemiology
The incidence of CRAO is approximately 1 in 100,000 people in the general population. Risk factors for CRAO include the following: being over 50 years of age, male gender, smoking, hypertension, tranexamic acid, diabetes mellitus, dyslipidemia, angina, valvular disease, transient hemiparesis, cancer, hypercoagulable blood conditions, lupus, or a family history of cerebrovascular or cardiovascular issues. Additional risk factors include endocarditis, atrial myxoma, inflammatory diseases of the blood vessels, and predisposition to forming blood clots.

See also 
 Central retinal vein occlusion
 Branch retinal artery occlusion
 Branch retinal vein occlusion
 Amaurosis fugax
 Ocular ischemic syndrome

References

External links 

Eye
Disorders of choroid and retina